Sir Charles Mordaunt, 6th Baronet (c.1697 – 11 March 1778), of Walton d'Eiville in Warwickshire, was an English landowner and Tory politician who sat in the House of Commons for 40 years from 1734 to 1774.

Mordaunt was the eldest son of Sir John Mordaunt, 5th Baronet, of Walton D’Eiville and Little Massingham and his second wife Penelope Warburton, daughter of Sir George Warburton, 1st Baronet, of Arley, Cheshire. He matriculated at New College, Oxford 8 June 1714, aged 16 and Lincoln's Inn on 21 May 1718. Mordaunt married Dorothy Conyers  daughter of John Conyers of Walthamstow on 1 December 1720. He succeeded to the baronetcy on 6 September 1721. Mordaunt's wife Dorothy died in 1726, and he married as his second wife Sophia Wodehouse, daughter of Sir John Wodehouse of Kimberley, Norfolk on 7 July 1730.

Mordaunt entered Parliament at a by- election on 6 February 1734 as Member of Parliament (MP) for Warwickshire. He and held the seat for the next forty years, never having to fight a contested election. In the 1750s, Mordaunt was regarded as one of the Tory leaders in the House, and in the early days of George III's reign, when the balance of power was in doubt, both court and opposition made vigorous efforts to win his support; he was eventually won over to the royal cause by his son, John, being appointed a Groom of the Bedchamber. Mordaunt retired from Parliament in 1774, expecting his son to succeed him as MP, but the Birmingham manufacturers put up a rival candidate and he was defeated.

Mordaunt died on 11 March 1778 having had two daughters by his first wife and two sons by his second wife. He was succeeded in the baronetcy by his son John.

References

 Lewis Namier & John Brooke, The History of Parliament: The House of Commons 1754-1790 (London: HMSO, 1964)

1690s births
1778 deaths
Alumni of New College, Oxford
Mordaunt baronets
Members of the Parliament of Great Britain for English constituencies
Year of birth uncertain
British MPs 1734–1741
British MPs 1741–1747
British MPs 1747–1754
British MPs 1754–1761
British MPs 1761–1768
British MPs 1768–1774
English landowners
Tory members of the Parliament of Great Britain